Gonti is an ancient and historical village near the river Betwa  in India and has a temple to Lord Hanuman i.e. Shahpura Sarkar Prachin Hanuman Mandir.

History 
The river Betwa is also called the Ganga of Bundelkhand, as it is one of the most important rivers there. Situated  10 km away from Erach, 45 km away from Garautha sub-district headquarters and 80 km away from Jhansi district headquarters, Gonti is famous for Shahpura Sarkar Prachin Hanuman Mandir.

In this mandir the idol of Lord Hanuman is about 12 feet tall. Every Tuesday, a large crowd of bhakts use to visit this temple to ask for their wishes to be granted. Locals believe that worshiping Lord Hanuman in this place guaranteed their fulfilment, as this place is considered the tapashya Sthali of Lord Hanuman.

Demographics 
Citizens of this village are Hindu. The predominant caste in this village is Yadav/Ahir/Yaduvanshi. Other castes are Pal/Gadariya, Teli, Kushwaha, Dhobi, and Chamar.

Gonti fort 
A fort situated in the vicinity of Shahpura Sarkar Pracheen Hanuman Mandir dates from about 1600 AD. The locals believe that due to curse of a girl, the kingdom and its whole population died due in a pandemic.

The fort is abandoned due to lack of maintenance And because locals also believe that taking anything from the fort triggers the curse.

Education 
• Prathmik Vidyaalay Gonti

• Purv Madhyamik Vidyalay Gonti

• Prathmik Vidyalay Shahpura Buzurg

References

Further reading 
 "Uttar Pradesh in Statistics," Kripa Shankar, APH Publishing, 1987, ISBN 9788170240716
 ↑ "Political Process in Uttar Pradesh: Identity, Economic Reforms, and Governance Archived 2017-04-23 at the Wayback Machine," Sudha Pai (editor), Centre for Political Studies, Jawaharlal Nehru University, Pearson Education India, 2007, ISBN 9788131707975

India articles needing expert attention
Villages in Jhalawar district